WikiStipendiya (Uzbek for WikiScholarship) is a WikiProject aimed at improving content on the Uzbek Wikipedia. The project is organized by the Youth Affairs the Republic of  Administration of the President of the Republic of Uzbekistan, the Council of Young Artists, and the Wikimedians of the Uzbek Language User Group.

The name of the project is a portmanteau of the words "wiki" and "stipendiya" (scholarship). It focuses on encouraging content creation on the Uzbek Wikipedia, particularly by students, but is not limited to any group. Another goal is to increase the number of editors on Uzbek-language wikis.

During the first phase of the project, which ran from 20 May 2022 to 20 December 2022, over 76,000 new articles were created on the Uzbek Wikiepdia, with the number of active contributors quadrupling. The edit-a-thon generated significant interest in Uzbekistan, with major publications running stories about the project throughout its duration. In 2023, WikiStipendiya won Best Project of the Year Award of the independent Rost24 news agency.

History 

WikiStipendiya was inspired by a 2019 decree of President Shavkat Mirziyoyev on encouraging the creation of quality digital content in Uzbek. The Youth Affairs Agency decided to launch an edit-a-thon with a large prize fund and secured the cooperation of the Agency of Information and Mass Communications and the Council of Young Artists. Soon thereafter the Wikimedians of the Uzbek Language User Group committed to fully support the initiative.

On 13 May 2022, a press conference was organized in Tashkent to spread the word about the edit-a-thon. WikiStipendiya generated significant interest among students and media in Uzbekistan, with several publications running stories about it. By the time the edit-a-thon officially started on May 20, close to 15,000 people had subscribed to the official Telegram channel of the edit-a-thon. With the support of the Youth Affairs Agency, a series of 12 video lessons were recorded and uploaded to Uzbek Wikipedia's YouTube channel prior to the official launch of the edit-a-thon.

On 30 June 2022, three active contributors of the Uzbek Wikipedia met with President Mirziyoyev during Youth Day celebrations in Tashkent and discussed the WikiStipendiya edit-a-thon in particular and the state of wiki projects in Uzbek in general.

Methods 
The first phase of WikiStipendiya was organized as an edit-a-thon running from 20 May 2022 to 20 December 2022. Participants had to be at least 15 years old and were encouraged to create content on any subject they found interesting. Still, six broad topics were proposed (natural sciences, history, art and culture, philosophy, technology, humanity, sports and games, and geography) and a work list of red linked articles was created to make it easier to find and create the missing articles.

The most active participants of the first phase were awarded one-off scholarships totaling US$30,000. Active members of the Wikimedians of the Uzbek Language User Group took on responsibility for evaluating the participants' contributions. Additionally, several rounds of interim contests were organized to attract new editors. Winners of interims contests were awarded laptops.

Sub-projects 

Several other sub-projects were organized within the marathon, including:
 ErkinLitsenziyalar: promotion of open content licenses
 WikiAudio: creating audio articles in Uzbek
 WikiAyollar: closing the gender gap on the Uzbek Wikipedia by creating content on women
 WikiOromgoh: two weeklong camps which brought together a total of 300 participants and Wikipedia administrators
 WikiSport: improving sport-related content on the Uzbek Wikipedia
 WikiTaʼlim: introducing Wiki Education to Uzbekistan

Results 

On December 20, 2022, the first phase of WikiStipendiya came to a close. By the completion of the first phase, the number of articles on the Uzbek Wikipedia had surpassed 216,000. In total, nearly 77,000 articles were created during period from May to December 2022. WikiStipendiya also resulted in significant growth of active users on the Uzbek Wikipedia. As of January 2023, a majority of new users that began to contribute during the contest remained active.

WikiStipendiya also contributed to a revival of the Wikipedia in the Karakalpak language, which is spoken mostly in the republic of Karakalpakstan in western Uzbekistan. The project had remained largely inactive before 2022.

References

External links 

 Official Telegram channel
 Project page on the Uzbek Wikipedia

Internet properties established in 2022
Wiki communities
Wikipedia